The Saddle King may refer to:

 The Saddle King (1921 film), American short silent Western film
 The Saddle King (1929 film), American silent western film